"Find Me (Odyssey to Anyoona)" is a song by German electronic music duo Jam & Spoon featuring American singer Plavka, released in July 1994 as the third single from their second album, Tripomatic Fairytales 2001 (1993). The song reached number one in Finland and number six in Italy, while in the United Kingdom and Australia, it peaked at number 22 in both countries. The song also entered the Eurochart Hot 100 on 30 July 1994, peaking at number 19 on 27 August. Its accompanying music video was A-listed on Germany's VIVA in August 1994.

Critical reception
AllMusic editor Keith Farley named the song a highlight of the album. In his weekly UK chart commentary, James Masterton described it as "a slightly ambient piece of Euro-dance". Pan-European magazine Music & Media commented that here, the team that brought you the smash "Right in the Night", "reads you another Madonna-esque myth from their Tripomatic Fairytales album." Andy Beevers from Music Week gave it four out of five, complimenting it as "a well-produced commercial trance epic with Spanish guitar effects. The addition of a catchy vocal from Plavka of the Rising High Collective has broadened the track's appeal and has helped to generate a real buzz." James Hamilton from the RM Dance Update described it as a "Plavka Lonich warbled pulsating tinkly 0-136-0bpm electro trance throbber". On the 1995 re-release, he described it as a "moodily started pulsating tinkly 0-136-0bpm trancer". Andrew Perry from Select declared it as a "fantastic track" with "tribal euphoria".

Airplay
"Find Me" entered the European airplay chart Border Breakers at number 22 on 23 July 1994, due to crossover airplay in West-, North- and South-Europe. The single peaked at number three on 3 September.

Track listings
 CD maxi-single (Europe, 1994)
 "Find Me (Odyssey to Anyoona)" (radio mix) – 4:02
 "Find Me (Odyssey to Anyoona)" – 7:30
 "Die Kraft der vier Herzen" – 8:04
 "The Tribe" – 6:46
 "Find Me (Odyssey to Anyoona)" – 10:00

 CD maxi-single remix (Europe, 1994)
 "Find Me (Odyssey to Anyoona)" (Dedicated to the Blondes) – 6:10
 "Find Me (Odyssey to Anyoona)" (House Ideaz) – 5:41
 "Find Me (Odyssey to Anyoona)" (Frühschicht) – 8:11
 "Find Me (Odyssey to Anyoona)" (Ben Liebrand remix) – 8:25

Charts

Weekly charts

Year-end charts

Release history

References

1994 singles
1994 songs
Dance Pool singles
English-language German songs
Epic Records singles
Jam & Spoon songs
Number-one singles in Finland
Songs written by Nosie Katzmann